Communauté d'agglomération Sud Sainte Baume is a communauté d'agglomération, an intercommunal structure, in the Var department, in the Provence-Alpes-Côte d'Azur region, southeastern France. Its name refers to the Sainte-Baume mountain ridge. Created in 2002, its seat is in La Cadière-d'Azur. Its area is 355.6 km2. Its population was 61,460 in 2019.

Composition
The communauté d'agglomération consists of the following 9 communes:

Bandol
Le Beausset
La Cadière-d'Azur
Le Castellet
Évenos
Riboux
Saint-Cyr-sur-Mer
Sanary-sur-Mer
Signes

References

Sud Sainte Baume
Sud Sainte Baume